Bad Dragon Enterprises, Inc. is an American manufacturer of fantasy-themed sex toys, primarily targeted at members of the furry fandom. Products are sold online and at conventions.

The CEO of Bad Dragon, Jan "Varka" Mulders, also owns the booru e621 (and its safe for work database mirror e926) and the role-playing website F-List, both of which also cater to furries.

History
Bad Dragon was founded in June 2008. Jan "Varka" Mulders, one of the four co-founders (the others being Brian "Athus Nadorian" Dyer, "Narse", and "Raith"), had begun making sex toys in his university dormitory in Scotland the previous year. The company is now based in Phoenix, Arizona.

Products
The company's products are primarily fantasy themed, with the creatures emulated including dragons, horses, orcas, chimeras, and werewolves. Bad Dragon also offers a 3-D interactive model to view certain areas of each toy.

Customers can also submit their own designs, some of which are chosen for limited production.

Sponsors
In 2022 a race car sponsored by Bad Dragon won TT6.

In popular culture
Bad Dragon is featured in the nerd culture documentary Traceroute.

References

External links

Bad Dragon Labs 

Manufacturing companies established in 2008
Retail companies established in 2008
Companies based in Arizona
Sex toy manufacturers
Sex industry in the United States
Furry fandom